The 2010 Natomas Men's Professional Tennis Tournament was a professional tennis tournament played on hard courts. It was the sixth edition of the tournament which was part of the 2010 ATP Challenger Tour. It took place in Sacramento, United States between 4 and 11 October 2010.

Singles main-draw entrants

Seeds

 Rankings are as of September 27, 2010.

Other entrants
The following players received wildcards into the singles main draw:
  Denis Kudla
  Michael McClune
  Dennis Novikov
  Fritz Wolmarans

The following players received entry from the qualifying draw:
  Daniel Cox
  Pierre-Ludovic Duclos
  Luka Gregorc
  Dimitar Kutrovsky
  Andrew Anderson (Lucky loser replacing Jesse Levine)

Champions

Singles

 John Millman def.  Robert Kendrick, 6–3, 6–2

Doubles

 Rik de Voest /  Izak van der Merwe def.  Nicholas Monroe /  Donald Young, 4–6, 6–4, [10–7]

External links
 Official website
 ITF Search 
 ATP official site

 
Natomas Men's Professional Tennis Tournament
Natomas Men's Professional Tennis Tournament
Natomas Men's Professional Tennis Tournament